Miltochrista eccentropis is a moth of the family Erebidae. It was described by Edward Meyrick in 1894. It is found in the Indian state of Assam and Myanmar.

References

eccentropis
Moths described in 1894
Moths of Asia